Spy × Family (stylized as SPY×FAMILY and pronounced "spy family") is a Japanese manga series written and illustrated by Tatsuya Endo. The story follows a spy who has to "build a family" to execute a mission, not realizing that the girl he adopts as his daughter is a telepath, and the woman he agrees to be in a marriage with is a skilled assassin. The series has been serialized biweekly on Shueisha's Shōnen Jump+ application and website since March 2019, with the chapters collected in ten tankōbon volumes as of October 2022. It was licensed in North America by Viz Media.

An anime television series adaptation produced by Wit Studio and CloverWorks premiered on TV Tokyo and its affiliate stations in April 2022, and was licensed by Muse Communication in Asia and Crunchyroll worldwide. The second half premiered in October 2022. A second season and an anime film were announced in December 2022 and are both set to premiere in 2023.

As of December 2022, Spy × Family had over 29 million copies in circulation, making it one of the best-selling manga series. The series has been praised for its storytelling, comedy, and artwork.

Plot 

In order to maintain the state of peace between the rival nations of Westalis and Ostania, a Westalian agent code-named "Twilight" is tasked with spying on Donovan Desmond, leader of the National Unity Party within Ostania. However, due to Desmond being notoriously reclusive, the only way Twilight can get close to him is to enroll a child in the same private school as Desmond's sons and pose as a fellow parent.

To accomplish this and present the image of a happy family, he creates the alias of Loid Forger, adopts a young orphan girl named Anya, and marries a woman named Yor Briar. However, unbeknownst to him Anya can read minds and Yor is in fact a professional assassin. Neither Loid nor Yor are aware of each other's true identities, or that Anya knows their true professions. The family later takes in a dog with precognitive abilities whom they name Bond. Despite these unknown factors and Twilight's occasional lapses of common sense due to years of being a spy, he must learn to play the role of the perfect father and husband in order to carry out his mission.

Production 
Tatsuya Endo and his editor Shihei Lin have known each other for over ten years; Lin was his initial editor on his first serial Tista (2007). When Lin was moved from the Jump Square editorial department to Shōnen Jump+, Endo happily followed, and they began developing a new work. Lin said that its reception among the editorial department was so good that serialization was practically decided before the official meeting was even held.

The initial draft was given a working title of Spy Family written in Japanese. When deciding the final name, Endo came up with over 100 options, but they ultimately decided to use the same title but in English and with a "cross" in between, the latter influenced by Hunter × Hunter. Lin said that he and Endo are always conscious of the line where violence, a necessary aspect in a spy manga, is given a pass for comedy's sake. With Tista and Blade of the Moon Princess both having a dark tone, the editor told Endo to give Spy × Family a more cheerful one. Anya was inspired by the main character of Rengoku no Ashe. Her extrasensory perception was decided early on, and Lin cited its use for comedic effect as one of the series' strengths. Lin said that the series has a broad readership among all ages and genders. He also cited Endo's clean art and ability to convey emotions as part of the manga's appeal.

Lin feels that the world and characters were firmly established as of volume two. As such, he revealed that he and Endo would start to include longer narratives in the series.

Media

Manga 

Written and illustrated by Tatsuya Endo, Spy × Family has been serialized biweekly on the Shōnen Jump+ application and website since March 25, 2019. The chapters, which are released every other Monday, have been collected and published into tankōbon volumes by Shueisha. Shueisha also simultaneously publishes the series in English for free on the Manga Plus app and website.

Viz Media began publishing Spy × Family in English digitally on their website for free on September 22, 2019. They released the first volume in print in Q2 2020.

The manga series has one companion book, Spy × Family Official Fanbook: Eyes Only. The book, serving as a collective information book, was published on May 2, 2022. It includes detailed information and analysis about the series' characters and worlds, colored artworks, early character designs, guests' art contributions, a long interview with Endo, and commentary on most chapters by Endo and Lin. On February 3, 2023, Viz Media announced that they have licensed the companion book for English publication.

Light novel 
The light novel , written by Aya Yajima, was published on July 2, 2021. The book contains four short story chapters and a seven-page "short novel". The first chapter, tells the story of the time Anya and Damian got lost in the forest on their school nature camp. The second chapter, recounts the day Yuri took Anya to experience a mock-up of future employment for kids. The third chapter, tells the story of Franky's short-lived love with a blind opera singer from a prestigious family. The fourth chapter, tells about the day the Forgers modeled for a famous painter in the park. In the "short novel" chapter, two waitresses were talking about their ideal family, the Forgers, among many unhappy families they saw. 

On February 3, 2023, Viz Media announced that they have licensed the light novel for English publication.

Anime 

On November 1, 2021, an anime television series adaptation for Spy × Family produced by Wit Studio and CloverWorks was announced via a trailer video and the anime's website. The series is directed by Kazuhiro Furuhashi, with character designs handled by Kazuaki Shimada, and music produced by (K)now_Name. The series ran for two split cours. The first cour aired from April 9 to June 25, 2022, on TXN stations. The second cour aired from October 1 to December 24, 2022. Crunchyroll licensed the series outside of Asia. Muse Communication licensed the series in Taiwan, South and Southeast Asia; they are streaming it on their YouTube channel (limited release in some of the available regions during the first-air run), Netflix, iQIYI, bilibili, Disney+ Hotstar and other regional streaming services. Netflix streamed the series in South Korea.

On April 11, 2022, Crunchyroll announced that the series would receive an English dub. It had an early preview on Crunchyroll's Twitch channel on April 15, before premiering the following day.

Accompanying the anime, the guidebook Animation × 1st Mission, which includes anime character designs, storyboards, key animations, promotion images, interviews and comments from the staff and the voice actors, was released on April 4, 2022. The book acts as a starter guide for the anime series and does not contain many details about later episodes beside the first two. The second guide book Mission Report:220409-0625, which provides in greater details of the first half of the first season, was released on September 2, 2022. It includes information for the main characters; details of the first twelve episodes; key arts for location settings and stories; storyboards; interviews and comments from the staff, the actors and the singers of the first opening and first ending songs, Official Hige Dandism and Gen Hoshino.

On December 18, 2022, a second season and a theatrical film were announced at the Jump Festa '23 event, with both premiering in 2023. The film will contain an original story written by Tatsuya Endo, who will also supervise the production and provide original character designs.

Musical 
A musical adaptation, titled , was reported to be in production under Toho Stage's production on May 1, 2022. The musical is set to premiere at Tokyo's Imperial Theatre in March 2023, with a nationwide tour following in April and May of the same year.

On September 30, 2022, they announced the musical play would debut on March 8, 2023 with Win Morisaki and Hiroki Suzuki playing Loid Forger, while Fūka Yuzuki and Mirei Sasaki playing Yor Forger. For Anya's role, the actor(s) will be selected via audition. The cast also features Kurumu Okamiya and Tsubasa Takizawa as Yuri Briar, Kento Kinouchi as Franky Franklin, Manato Asaka as Sylvia Sherwood, Sōma Suzuki as Henry Henderson, and Nonoka Yamaguchi as Fiona Frost. They also announce that G2 will direct the musical and also write the screenplay and lyrics and Shuhei Kamimura will be in charge of composing, arranging, and directing the music. For the nationwide tour, the musical will be performed in the KOBELCO Grand Hall at Hyogo Performing Arts Center in Nishinomiya, Hyōgo Prefecture in April and at Hakata-za Theatre in Fukuoka, Fukuoka Prefecture in May. On December 14, 2022, the cast for Anya Forger is announced; she will be played interchangeably by 4 actresses: Risa Masuda, Aoi Ikemuda, Miharu Izawa, Miharu Fukuchi. On January 16, 2022, it was reported that Eima Saitō and Kichinosuke Yonemoto are cast to play child Loid's roles.

Others 
An amusement park attraction based on the series, named , is opened for visitors at Universal Studios Japan theme park from February 17 to July 2, 2023. Participants are put on the role of a newcomer agent from the in-universe spy agency WISE, trying solving hidden codes at various locations around the park. After successfully solving the codes, they will be permitted to attend a live show featuring the Forger family members.

Reception

Popularity 
In December 2019, Brutus magazine included the series on their "Most Dangerous Manga" list, which included works with the most "stimulating" and thought-provoking themes. Later that same month, Polygon included it on a list of the best comics of 2019. The 2020 edition of the Kono Manga ga Sugoi! guidebook named Spy × Family the best manga series for male readers. It came in first on Honya Club's Nationwide Bookstore Employees' Recommended Comics of 2020 list, compiled by surveying 1,100 professional bookstore employees in Japan. It was named as the "No. 1 Popular Web Comic of 2019," the "No. 1 Popular Shōnen Jump+ Work," and a "Signature Work of Jump+". In May 2022, as stated by the manga's editor Shihei Lin, the series reached 350 million views on Shōnen Jump+. In August 2022, the series reached 480 million views. About a month later, the series reached 500 million views. Also in December of the same year, the manga topped the 2022 "Book of the Year" list by Da Vinci magazine.

The anime had also received high TV rating percentage since its release in April 2022, until the end of its first season. With the premiere of its second cour on October 1, 2022, Spy × Family sets a new record for TV Tokyo in time shift audience ratings. The president of TV Tokyo reveals that the series' second part was the "best among all programs on all stations for the July 2022 season", including the first episode of the second cour into July quarter's statistics. Its debut episode was the second most watched in Japanese streaming site. The series took second place in April and later rose and remained in the first place for the next three months (from May to July) in the Japanese monthly streaming rank lists and VOD rank lists, despite the fact that the anime stopped releasing new episodes in July. In a survey conducted by FinT, Spy × Family and Anya were ranked no. 1 and no. 4 respectively on the top trending things among Generation Z in Japan for 2022. In the same survey,  was the no. 1 trending phrase of the year in part due to a mash-up with the song "Renai Circulation" on TikTok. In 2022, Spy × Family won in the anime category of the Yahoo! Japan Search Awards, based on the number of searches for a particular term compared to the year before.

Spy × Family has also started gaining mainstream popularity with a wide range of age groups, from children to adults. An official from Takara Tomy Arts said: "[the series] is popular among a wide range of people, just like Demon Slayer: Kimetsu no Yaiba. Anya is particularly popular. It is likely that there will be even more toys and goods in the future, including products for children."

Sales 
In 2019, Spy × Family had 300,000 copies in circulation, including digital and physical sales, less than a month after the release of its first volume. The series reached 800,000 copies 2 months later, upon the release of its second volume. This number exceeded 2 million with the release of volume three, and 3 million in circulation by volume four. Less than two weeks before the release of its fourth volume, Spy × Family became the second fastest and successful hit, behind Assassination Classroom. According to Oricon, volumes three and four of the series were some of the top 30 best-selling manga volumes of 2020. It became the first Shōnen Jump+ series to receive an initial print run of over 1 million copies with its sixth volume. With its 6th volume released in December 2020, Spy × Family had over 8 million digital and physical copies in circulation. At that time, it was the ninth best-selling manga in 2020, with over 4.5 million copies sold within that year.

In 2020, the 3rd volume of Spy × Family had received an initial print run of 400,000 copies. Along with Kingdom, it had an initial print run of 1 million copies, with its sixth volume in 2021. In May 2021, Spy × Family had reached 10 million copies in circulation and increased to 11 million copies by the next month. With 537,558 copies sold in its first week, volume six became the series' second consecutive volume to debut at number one on Oricon's weekly list of the best-selling manga. Volume six was among the top 30 best-selling manga volumes of 2021 according to Oricon. As of November 2021, the manga had over 12.5 million copies in circulation. It was the eighth best-selling manga in 2021, with over 4.9 million copies sold within that year. The series was ranked 10th on Rakuten's Top 20 Best Selling Digital Manga of 2020 and 16th in 2021.

On April 3, 2022, on the eve of the release of volume 9 and the premiere of the anime, the manga was reported to have over 15 million copies in circulation. As of May 2022, the manga had over 21 million copies in circulation. It was tentatively the 3rd best-selling manga from the last month of 2021 to the first 5 months of 2022. In August 2022, the manga had over 25 million copies in circulation, doubling in number comparing with 9 months before. In October, right around the return of the anime's second cour and the release of volume 10, it was reported that the series had more than 26.5 million copies in circulation. As of October, the manga had over 27 million copies in circulation. It was the third best-selling manga series in 2022, with over 10.6 million copies sold; its first ten volumes were among the 25 best-selling manga volumes of the year. The series was also ranked 5th on Rakuten's Top 20 Best Selling Digital Manga of 2022. In December the same year, it is reported that the series has passed 29 million copies in circulation.

The volumes of Spy × Family sold well in North America. They were ranked on NPD BookScan's monthly top 20 adult graphic novels list since June 2020. Several volumes of the manga were also ranked on The New York Times Graphic Books and Manga bestseller monthly list since May 2021. In the United States, the series' 6 volumes collectively sold 220,000 copies in 2021. In France, the series has had one million sold copies as of volume 6.

Critical response 
In a positive review of the first 11 chapters, Antonio Mireles of The Fandom Post summed up Spy × Family as a great comedy about a dysfunctional family put into uncanny situations that never pan out as planned due to their unique personalities. He described the family setup of Loid as the straight man, Yor the "dumb character" and Anya the adorable child "that readers fall in love with," as the perfect recipe for a comedy. However, he felt the humor that comes from Yor being the dumb character was underutilized. Comic Book Resources' Hannah Collins hailed the first volume as one of the best manga releases of 2020. She had strong praise for Endo's art; writing that "Action-comedy is no mean feat even in animated or live-action mediums. To pull it off so well in still images takes real artistic talent." The reviewer called the artist's range of facial expressions his secret weapon, which he deploys to win over the hearts and minds of readers; particularity with those of Anya, whom Collins said, "steals every page she appears on."

Morgana Santilli of The Beat stated that Spy × Family volume one does an excellent job balancing fun espionage action with heartwarming family moments. She called Endo's art "clean and appealing," which makes his parody of post-war Berlin easily recognizable. Santilli compared its comedy to that of From Eroica with Love, another Cold War-centric series. In a review for Polygon, Julia Lee stated that Endo takes a premise that could make a "typical, corny, action manga" and uses it to make one of the funniest series out right now. Like the other reviewers, Lee praised Endo's art, writing that he has a knack for action scenes, as well as "expressive panels that really show you how the characters are feeling."

Awards and nominations

Notes

References

External links 
Spy × Family at Shonen Jump+
Spy × Family official blog
Spy × Family at Manga Plus
Spy × Family at Viz
  

 
2019 webcomic debuts
2022 anime television series debuts
Action anime and manga
Anime series based on manga
CloverWorks
Comedy anime and manga
Comics set in a fictional country
Comics set in the 1980s
Crunchyroll anime
Crunchyroll Anime Awards winners
Espionage in anime and manga
Espionage television series
Fiction about telepathy
Japanese webcomics
Marriage in anime and manga
Musicals based on anime and manga
Muse Communication
School life in anime and manga
Shōnen manga
Shueisha manga
Spy comics
Television series set in fictional countries
Television series set in the 1980s
Toho Animation
TV Tokyo original programming
Upcoming anime television series
Viz Media manga
Webcomics in print
Wit Studio
Works about adoption